On April 20, 1818, Jacob Spangler (DR) resigned from Congress, where he'd represented .  A special election was held that year to fill the resulting vacancy.

Election results

Hostetter took his seat on November 16 at the start of the Second Session.

See also
List of special elections to the United States House of Representatives

References

Pennsylvania 1818 04
Pennsylvania 1818 04
1818 04
Pennsylvania 04
United States House of Representatives 04
United States House of Representatives 1818 04
April 1818 events